Lance Creek is a stream in Stanley County, South Dakota, in the United States. It is a tributary of the Bad River.

Lance Creek was named for an old Indian lance found there.

See also
List of rivers of South Dakota

References

Rivers of Stanley County, South Dakota
Rivers of South Dakota